Jupucunca (possibly from Quechua qhupu hump, kunka throat, gullet, "hump throat") is a  mountain in the Vilcanota mountain range in the Andes of Peru. It is situated in the Cusco Region, Canchis Province, on the border of the districts of San Pablo and Sicuani.

References 

Mountains of Cusco Region
Mountains of Peru